Mississippi Highway 345 (MS 345) is a  north–south state highway in Pontotoc County, Mississippi, connecting the city of Pontotoc with the town of Ecru.

Route description
MS 345 begins in the city of Pontotoc at an intersection with MS 9 (North Main Street) at the northern edge of downtown. The highway winds its way through a mix of farmland and wooded hills for the next several miles, where it crosses Cherry Creek (one of two creeks forming the Little Tallahatchie River) before passing through the community of Cherry Creek, where it makes a sharp left turn. MS 345 now enters the town of Ecru along Main Street and passes through neighborhoods, then straight through downtown before coming to an end at an intersection with MS 15.

The entire length of Mississippi Highway 345 is a two-lane highway, lying entirely in Pontotoc County.

Major intersections

References

External links

345
Transportation in Pontotoc County, Mississippi